Ataur Rahman Khan (1 July 1907 – 7 December 1991) was a Bangladeshi lawyer, politician and writer, and served as Chief Minister of East Pakistan from 1 September 1956 – March 1958, and as the Prime Minister of Bangladesh from 30 March 1984 to 9 July 1986.

Early life 

Ataur Rahman Khan was born on 1 July 1905/1907 at Balia village, Dhamrai Thana, Dhaka District, East Bengal, British India. He pgraduated from Pogose School in Dhaka in 1924. He then graduated from Jagannath College in 1927. He obtained bachelor's degree in economics and law from the University of Dhaka in 1930 and 1936 respectively.

Career 
Khan joined the Dhaka District Bar in 1937. He then joined the judicial branch of the Civil Service as a Munsiff in 1942 where he worked until 1944. He joined the Krishak Praja Samiti and served as the secretary of the Dhaka District unit. In 1944, he joined the All India Muslim League. He served as the Vice President of the Manikganj unit of the Muslim League. Khan joined the creation of the Awami Muslim League in 1949 and served as its vice-president until 1964. He was a leader of the Sarbadaliya Chhatra Sangram Parishad who played the lead role in the Bengali Language movement in 1952 for making Bengali Language a state language of Pakistan.

In 1954, Khan was the joint convenor of the United Front which won the Provincial election. He himself was elected to the East Bengal Legislative Assembly and made the Ministry of Civil Supplies in the United Front government under A. K. Fazlul Huq. In 1955, He was elected to the Constituent Assembly of Pakistan. From 1955 to 1956, he was the leader of the opposition in the East Pakistan Provincial Assembly.

After Hussain Shaheed Suhrawardy became Prime Minister of Pakistan got Abu Hossain Sarkar to resign as Chief Minister of East Pakistan so that Khan could replace him. Khan formed government of East Pakistan on 1 September 1956 and became the Chief Minister of East Pakistan. He found himself in a power struggle with the Awami League General Secretary Sheikh Mujibur Rahman. Sheikh Mujib was more popular with Awami League party workers than Khan. His government lasted until March 1958. On 31 March 1958, Governor A. K. Fazlul Huq removed Khan from the post of chief Minister and appointed Abu Hossain Sarkar. Huq was removed from the post of governor by President Iskander Mirza and Khan was back as the Chief Minister of East Pakistan in 12 hours. Presidents rule was declared and two months later Khan was again Chief Minister. There was a brawl in the East Bengal Legislative Assembly in which Deputy Speaker Shahed Ali Patwary was killed and General Ayub Khan took over power in Pakistan when martial law was declared in Pakistan. He had been removed and restored to the post of Chief Minister three times in one year. He and Suhrawardy's central and provincial government was criticised by Abdul Hamid Khan Bhashani, leader of the leftist fraction of Awami League, while supported by Sheikh Mujibur Rahman, the leader of the nationalist fraction of Awami League. He worked Hussain Shaheed Suhrawardy under the National Democratic Front to restore democracy to Pakistan. Khan had succeed Hussain Shaheed Suhrawardy as President of Awami League in 1963 further deteriorating relationship with Sheikh Mujibur Rahman. In 1969, he was elected president of Dhaka High Court Bar Association. In 1969, he created a new political party called Jatiya League over differences with Sheikh Mujibur Rahman.

In 1970, Khan contested the elections for the national assembly but lost. During the Bangladesh Liberation War, Khan was detained for six months by Pakistan Army and released in September. After the Independence of Bangladesh, he was elected to the parliament of Bangladesh in 1973. In 1975, he joined the Sheikh Mujibur Rahman lead Bangladesh Krishak Sramik Awami League government. He revived his Jatiya League after the government was removed from power in a series of coups.

Khan was elected to parliament in 1979. He campaigned against the rule General Hussain Mohammad Ershad before joining him. He was made the Prime Minister in 1984 which office he held until 1 January 1985.

Bibliography

 Ojarotir Dui Bochhor (1963) 
 Shoiracharer Dosh Bochhor (1969) 
 Prodhan-Montritter Noi Maash (1987) 
 Oboruddhor Noi Maash (1990).

Death
Khan died in Dhaka on 7 December 1991 at the age of 86 and is buried inside Parliament grounds. His son, Ziaur Rahman Khan (died 2021), was a member of parliament from Bangladesh Nationalist Party. His son and grandson were denied access to the grave without a security pass by the police guarding the parliament. The Bangladesh Nationalist Party organizes remembrance events on his death anniversary.

References 

|-

1991 deaths
Jatiya Party politicians
Prime Ministers of Bangladesh
1905 births
People of East Pakistan
Krishak Sramik Party politicians
People from Dhaka District
Pakistani MNAs 1955–1958
20th-century Bengalis
Bangladesh Krishak Sramik Awami League central committee members
Chief Ministers of East Pakistan
University of Dhaka alumni
Pogose School alumni